"Ni Freud Ni Tu Mamá" (English: "Neither Freud Nor Your Mother") is a song by Spanish-born Mexican singer and actress Belinda from her second studio album, Utopía (2006). It was produced by Greg Wells and written by Belinda, Nacho Peregrín, Wells and Shelly Peiken. The song was released as the lead single from Utopía on September 19, 2006, by EMI Televisa Music. The English version, "If We Were", is Belinda's most successful crossover single to date.

Release 
"Ni Freud Ni Tu Mamá" debuted on August 21, 2006, on the Mexican radio stations and became a top-five hit single in Central and South America.

The single was released on iTunes on September 19, 2006 and the song was used as the opening theme for the Mexican telenovela, Código Postal, in Univision Puerto Rico. The English version of the song, titled "If We Were", was featured on the re-release of Utopía, known as Utopía², and it was also released as a single on iTunes on August 28, 2007.

Music video 
The music video was directed by Scott Speer. The video depicts Belinda swimming in an underwater urban setting in the middle of what appears to be a storm. It has been reported that Belinda found singing in perflubron challenging. She appears to be floating in the air. She's also seen singing with her band. Near the bridge of the song, guest stars, Drew Seeley and Raven-Symoné (Belinda's friend and The Cheetah Girls 2 co-star) can be found street-dancing around Belinda. The video was released on October 10, 2006. There is a director's cut version of "Ni Freud Ni Tu Mamá" and it can be viewed on YouTube.

With the release of "If We Were" in Europe, Belinda re-shot some scenes of her singing in English and edited the original music video with the new scenes. The video became quite successful in Italy, where it peaked at number 6 on the TRL Italy Countdown. There are two edited versions of "If We Were", both in which can be viewed on YouTube. Both versions clip "Ni Freud Ni Tu Mamá", but the first uses an edited version of the song, and do not show Belinda actually singing. The second, although, clips the parts where Belinda is not singing or the words don't need to fit, and uses new scenes, recorded in English.

Track listing 
These are the formats and track listings of major single releases of "Ni Freud Ni Tu Mamá" and "If We Were".

Ni Freud Ni Tu Mamá - Digital Download
(B000T1EOHK; Released September 19, 2007)
 Ni Freud Ni Tu Mamá (Album Version)

Ni Freud Ni Tu Mamá - Club Promo
 Ni Freud Ni Tu Mamá (Dance Version)
 Ni Freud Ni Tu Mamá (Pop Version)
 Ni Freud Ni Tu Mamá (Reggaeton Version)

Ni Freud Ni Tu Mamá - Remixes CD
 Ni Freud Ni Tu Mamá (Original Version)
 Ni Freud Ni Tu Mamá (Piano Version)
 Ni Freud Ni Tu Mamá (Pop Version)
 Ni Freud NI Tu Mamá (Soft Rock Version)
 Ni Freud Ni Tu Mamá (Alternative Version)
 Ni Freud Ni Tu Mamá (Remix)

If We Were - Digital Download
(B000VI791E; Released August 28, 2007)
 If We Were (Album Version)

If We Were - Promo CD
(B000XQ9N22; Released January 1, 2007)
 If We Were
 Ni Freud Ni Tu Mamá

If We Were - CD Maxi
(B000XQ9N22; Released November 23, 2007)
 If We Were
 Good... Good
 Never Enough
 Ni Freud Ni Tu Mamá

Ni Freud Ni Tu Mamá / If We Were - Brazilian Digital Download
 Ni Freud Ni Tu Mamá - 3:24
 If We Were - 3:25
 Ni Freud Ni Tu Mamá (Soft Rock Version) - 3:18
 If We Were (Acoustic Version) - 3:29

If We Were - Brazilian Maxi Single
 If We Were
 See A Little Light
 End Of The Day
 Never Enough
 Why Wait?
 Your Hero (feat. Finley)

Charts

"Ni Freud Ni Tu Mamá"

"If We Were"

References 

2006 singles
2007 singles
Belinda Peregrín songs
Spanish-language songs
Music videos directed by Scott Speer
Songs written by Greg Wells
Songs written by Shelly Peiken
Songs written by Belinda Peregrín
Song recordings produced by Greg Wells
Songs written by Nacho Peregrín
2006 songs
EMI Televisa Music singles
English-language Mexican songs